Barry Randall (born March 25, 1943 in London, Ontario) is a former offensive lineman who played eleven seasons for the Montreal Alouettes of the Canadian Football League, winning three Grey Cups.

External links
Randall was a leader for Als
CFLAPEDIA BIO
FANBASE BIO

1943 births
Canadian football offensive linemen
Eastern Washington Eagles football players
Living people
Montreal Alouettes players
Players of Canadian football from Ontario
Sportspeople from London, Ontario